Ansfrid may refer to:

Ansfrid of Friuli, duke 
Ansfrid of Nonantola, abbot
Ansfrid of Utrecht (died 1010) (Saint Ansfrid), bishop